Deworming (sometimes known as worming, drenching or dehelmintization) is the giving of an anthelmintic drug (a wormer, dewormer, or drench) to a human or animals to rid them of helminths parasites, such as roundworm, flukes and tapeworm.  Purge dewormers for use in livestock can be formulated as a feed supplement that is eaten, a paste or gel that is deposited at the back of the animal's mouth, a liquid drench given orally, an injectable, or as a pour-on which can be applied to the animal's topline.  In dogs and cats, purge dewormers come in many forms including a granular form to be added to food, pill form, chew tablets, and liquid suspensions.

Animals

Large animal 
Horses are most often dewormed with a paste or gel placed on the back of the animal's mouth via a dosing syringe; feed dewormers are also used, both single-dose varieties and in a daily, "continuous" feed form. Deworming (drenching) a sheep is usually done with a specific drenching gun that squirts an anthelmintic into the sheep's throat. Recently anthelmintic herbal drugs and vaccines have been used against gastrointestinal nematodes due to an increase in resistance to anthelmintic drugs that showed significant potential against parasites in large animals.

Anthelmintics

Small animal 
The Centers for Disease Control and Prevention recommends deworming treatments at 2, 4, 6, and 8 weeks of age for puppies, as well as concurrent treatments given to the mother to eliminate reactivated larvae and prevent horizontal transmission from puppies that may be shedding roundworm and hookworm eggs.

They also recommend deworming treatments at 3, 5, 7, and 9 weeks of age for kittens and the mother.

Additionally, the Companion Animal Parasite Council (CAPC) further recommends quarterly treatments for all adult dogs and cats, depending on animal health and lifestyle factors.

Humans 

Mass deworming campaigns of school children have been used both as a preventive as well as a treatment method for helminthiasis, which includes soil transmitted helminthiasis in children. Children can be treated by administering, for example, mebendazole and albendazole. The cost is relatively low. According to the World Health Organization (WHO), over 870 million children (half of the children in the world) are at risk of parasitic worm infection.  Worm infections interfere with nutrient uptake, can lead to anemia, malnourishment and impaired mental and physical development, and pose a serious threat to children's health, education, and productivity. Infected children are often too sick or tired to concentrate at school, or to attend at all.

See also
Anthelmintic
Horse care
Parasitism

References 

Veterinary procedures